No. 110 Helicopter Unit (Vanguards) is a Helicopter Unit and is equipped with Mil Mi-8 and based at Kumbhirgram Air Force Station.

History
The Unit received Presidential Standard on 9 March 2011.

Assignments
Sino-Indian War (NEFA Sector)

Aircraft
Mil Mi-4
Mi-8/8T

References

110